Orippo was a Roman town of Hispania Baetica, on the road from Gades to Hispalis.

History 

Orippo is commonly identified with Villa de dos Hermaños, though some have mentioned Alcala de Guadaira and Torre de los Herberos. 

Ancient coins of the place often have a bunch of grapes, showing that the neighbourhood was rich in wines, a character which it still preserves.

See also 

 Via Augusta
 Ancient Iberian coinage
 Archeological Museum of Seville

References

Sources

Primary 

 Bostock, John; Riley, H. T. (1855). The Natural History of Pliny. Vol. 1. London: Henry G. Bohn. p. 160.

Secondary 

 Dyer, Thomas H. (1857). "Orippo". In Smith, William (ed.). Dictionary of Greek and Roman Geography. Vol. 2: Iabadius–Zymethus. London: Walton and Maberly. p. 493. 

Roman towns and cities in Spain
Destroyed towns